The Odzi River is a tributary of the Save River in Zimbabwe. It joins the latter river at Nyanyadzi. It is dammed at Osborne Dam.

The Odzani River is a westward-flowing tributary of the Odzi, rising near Penhalonga north of the city of Mutare. The Odzani and Smallbridge dams on the Ozani are part of the water-supply system for Mutare. Odzani Dam, constructed in 1967, created Lake Alexander.

References

Geography of Manicaland Province
Rivers of Zimbabwe
Save River (Africa)